Apodospora is a genus of fungi, formerly within the Lasiosphaeriaceae family. As on 2020, it was placed in the Bombardiaceae family.

Species
As accepted by Species Fungorum;
Apodospora bulgarica 
Apodospora gotlandica 
Apodospora peruviana 
Apodospora simulans 
Apodospora thescelina 
Apodospora viridis

References

External links
Apodospora at Index Fungorum

Sordariales